Gayo may refer to:

 Gayo language of Sumatra
 Gayo people, an ethnic group in Aceh, Indonesia
 Gayo Lues Regency, a regency in Aceh, Indonesia
 Gayo, or K-pop, the Korean term for pop music
 Gayo (poem), old form of the Korean traditional poetry

See also
 Gay (disambiguation)
 Gaios, a port in Greece
 Gaia (disambiguation)
 Mayo (disambiguation)

Language and nationality disambiguation pages